Ballee is a civil parish in County Down, Northern Ireland. It is situated mainly in the historic barony of Lecale Lower, with one townland in the barony of Lecale Upper.

Townlands
Ballee civil parish contains the following townlands:

Ballyalton
Ballybrannagh Lower
Ballybrannagh Upper
Ballyclander Lower
Ballyclander Upper
Ballycruttle
Ballyhosset
Ballyhosset Milltown
Ballymurry
Ballynagross Lower
Ballynagross Upper
Ballyrenan
Ballysallagh
Ballystokes
Ballytrustan
Ballywalter
Carrowbaghran
Carrownacaw
Church Ballee
Dillin
Jordans Crew
Kildares Crew
Loughmoney
Slievenagriddle
Spittle Ballee
Spittle Quarter

See also
List of civil parishes of County Down

References